Las Tres Villas is a municipality of Almería province, in the autonomous community of Andalusia, Spain.

Demographics

References

External links
  Las Tres Villas - Sistema de Información Multiterritorial de Andalucía
  Las Tres Villas - Diputación Provincial de Almería

Municipalities in the Province of Almería